USRC Harrison was the lead ship of her topsail schooner class, which was built and operated by the United States Revenue-Marine, later Revenue Cutter Service, between 1849 and 1856.

Design and construction 
In 1848, the Revenue Cutter Service awarded contracts for seven cutters, two for use on the Great Lakes. Both ships were topsail schooners, with a 115-ton draft and total cost of $12,300.

A proposal by John Carrick for the cutter's construction at Erie, Pennsylvania was accepted on 16 October 1848. Harrison was completed, delivered and accepted on 11 August 1849.

Service history 
The Harrison would be stationed at Oswego, New York for her entire career until her disposition in 1856. On 12 November 1852 she was damaged by a storm, requiring repairs estimated to be worth $1,280. On 6 October 1856 she was auctioned to Messrs. Merry and Gay for $1,690 after it was authorized by the United States Congress.

References 

United States Revenue Cutter Service
Ships of the United States Revenue Cutter Service